Chuspicocha (possibly from Quechua ch'uspi insect, generic name of flies or two-winged insects; fly, qucha lake, "fly lake" or "insect lake") is a lake in Peru located in the Lima Region, Yauyos Province, Tanta District. Chuspicocha lies south of the Pariacaca mountain range and Paucarcocha and north of Ticllacocha and Piscococha, near the village of Tanta.

See also
 Nor Yauyos-Cochas Landscape Reserve
 List of lakes in Peru

References

Lakes of Peru
Lakes of Lima Region